Waterview may refer to:
Waterview, Kentucky, United States
Waterview, Maryland
Waterview, New Zealand
Waterview, Queensland, in Australia